Reili Rand (born 19 March 1991) is an Estonian politician. She is a member of XIV Riigikogu, representing the Social Democratic Party. Formerly, she was the mayor of Hiiumaa parish in 2015-2017.

She was born in Kärdla. In 2014, she graduated from Tartu University.

Rand led the Hiiu parish in 2015-2017.

References

Living people
1991 births
Social Democratic Party (Estonia) politicians
21st-century Estonian politicians
University of Tartu alumni
21st-century Estonian women politicians
Women members of the Riigikogu
Members of the Riigikogu, 2019–2023
People from Kärdla